Lichenoporidae is a family of bryozoans belonging to the order Cyclostomatida.

Genera

Genera:
 Actinotaxia Hamm, 1881
 Bimulticavea d'Orbigny, 1853
 Camerapora Meunier & Pergens, 1885

References

Bryozoan families